The Club Fugazi is a small theater and nightclub located in the North Beach, San Francisco, California district of San Francisco, California.  The address is 678 Green Street.

Original building and endowment 
The theater is on the ground floor in a building which is formally known as Casa Coloniale Italiana John F. Fugazi, a community center for the Italian Colony of San Francisco.  The building was financed by a donation from Cavaliere Ufficiale John F. Fugazi, who founded the Columbus Savings and Loan Society in 1893 as well as the Banca Popolare Operaia Italiana in 1906.  Both banks eventually merged with the Bank of Italy, which was later renamed the Bank of America.

Fugazi had promised to establish a community center for the Italian Colony of San Francisco following the Great Earthquake and Fire of 1906, but it wasn't until 1913 that the project began.

Fugazi Hall was built in 1913 on a parcel of land donated by Fugazi's second wife, Joanna Fugazi. The building was designed by Italian architect Italo Zanolini, who also designed the Banca Popolare Operaia Italiana building at 2 Columbus Avenue (1906) most recently occupied by the Church of Scientology, as well as the building at 255 Columbus Avenue (1916), most recently occupied by Vesuvio Restaurant.  Zanolini also designed John F. Fugazi's private mausoleum chapel at the Italian Cemetery in Colma.

Fugazi establish a trust to ensure that future generations of Italian-Americans would be able to utilize the building.  The Trust is administered by the Italian-American Community Services Agency (formally known as the Italian Board of Relief and the Italian-American Welfare Agency), which was established in 1916.

1950s and 1960s 
In the 1950s and early 1960s, Fugazi Hall was a common venue for poetry reading by members of the beat community. Although many might believe that Club Fugazi is referenced in Allen Ginsberg's "Howl": "Noon in desolate Fugazzi's, listening to the crack...", this actually refers to Fugazzi's in New York City, another Beat hangout (note the two z's in the name in the poem, as well as all the geographical references in that part of the poem being in NYC.

The famous Thelonious Alone in San Francisco album was recorded by Thelonious Monk in October 1959 at the Fugazi Hall.  

In 1966, it also hosted the University of San Francisco's Freshman Class end-of-year dance.  Two bands auditioned there for the upcoming event.  The band that was rejected was Big Brother and the Holding Company because their new singer – she had joined the band that week – was too bluesy for a dance ... her name was Janis Joplin.

Beach Blanket Babylon, 1974–2019 
Club Fugazi hosted Beach Blanket Babylon beginning in June, 1974, as a "very funny, very silly revue"   It reached over 6.5 million patrons, toured to Las Vegas and London;  opened the Academy Awards; and  counted Queen Elizabeth II, Prince Charles, David Bowie, Liza Minnelli and Robin Williams among its audience members.

The portion of Green Street in front of the club was renamed Beach Blanket Babylon Boulevard in 1996, in honor of the musical revue.

Current production 
In September 2021, The 7 Fingers artistic collective debuted Dear San Francisco. Powered by acrobatics, choreography, spoken word, video projections, shadow play, and original music, the new resident show brings audiences on a romp through both the essence and the myth of San Francisco. From the Gold Rush and 1906 earthquake, to beat poetry and the mysterious fog, San Francisco comes vividly to life, performed by an international cast of world-class acrobats across a variety of disciplines - including hoop diving, Chinese pole, Korean plank, hand-balancing, juggling, and “hand-to-trap”. San Francisco Chronicle gave the show its highest rating, calling it "a love letter not just to the city but also to the human body."

References

Theatres in San Francisco
Nightclubs in San Francisco
North Beach, San Francisco